Peep Show is the fourth studio album by English band Alternative TV, released in 1987 by record label Anagram.

Track listing
"Chrissie's Moon"
"Let's Sleep Now"
"Tumble Time"
"The River"
"Boy Eats Girl"
"My Baby's Laughing (Empty Summer Dream)"
"Scandal"
"White Walls"
"Animal"

Personnel
Mark Perry - guitar, percussion, vocals
Martin "Protag" Neish - guitar
Steve Cannell - bass, keyboards, percussion
Allison Phillips - drums, percussion
Terry Edwards - saxophone, trumpet
Dave Jago - trombone
Frank Sweeney - violin, viola
Justin Adams - guitar on "Let's Sleep Now"
Dave George - keyboards on "Tumble Time", "The River" and "White Walls"
Izzy Davies - vocals on "Tumble Time" and "White Walls"
Karl Blake - guitar on "Boy Eats Girl"
Anno Graver - vocals on "Boy Eats Girl"
Clive Giblin - guitar on "Animal"

References

External links 

 

Alternative TV albums
1987 albums
Albums produced by Grant Showbiz